Harma was a fortress and town, but not a deme, of ancient Attica, near Phyle, situated on a height visible from Athens. 

The site of Harma is located at a site called Arma.

References

Populated places in ancient Attica
Former populated places in Greece